Rāmachandra Mishra (1 June 1915–6 November 1995), better known by his pen name Faturananda, was an Indian humorist and satirical writer in Odia. He was the founder of the Sarasa Sāhitya Samiti, a literary organisation. Mishra established "Kāntakabi Award" in the name of Laxmikanta Mohapatra. His early life was spent in struggling which is the core part of his autobiography Mo phutā dangāra kāhāni. Mishra preferred "Faturānanda" as a pen name in all his writings. Some of his popular writings include Nākatā Chitrakar (1953), Sāhi Mahābharat. His satirical writings in Odia were based on political reality and prevailing cynicism.

Early life 
Mishra was born on 1 June 1915 in Cuttack, Odisha to Bidyādhar Mishra and Subhadrā Mishra.

Literary career 
Faturānanda is well known for his distinctly unique and original style of writing. He uses simple and colloquial language with a natural flow. Underlying theme in all his works is social issues addressed either directly or indirectly.

According to Faturānanda “Stories I wrote initially were of tragic nature. After publication of “Dagaro” from Cuttack I started noticing the comic and humorous stories in it. Those were more or less of the same plot. For example, romance between a college boy and a college girl. Both decide to get married, but face some obstacle just before it. Finally the end of their romance. After seeing the same situation in all these published stories, I said – can’t there be any humor without these college boys and college girls. I made up my mind then and there not to ever include romance in my humor and satire. I have followed this principle ever since."

Awards and Recognitions 
 Orissā Sāhitya Academy
 Saralā Puraskār, Bhubaneswar
 Jadumani Sāhitya Sansada, Nayāgada
 Rādhānātha Pāthāgara, Sora, Bāleswar
 Saralā Sāhitya Sansada, Cuttack
 Utkal Pāthaka Sansada, Cuttack
 Nāgarika Sambardhanā, Rourkela

Bibliography

Autobiography 
 Mo Phutā Dangāra Kāhāni, 1989

Novel 
 Nākatā Chitrakar, 1953

Lyrical Poem 
 Sāhi Mahābhārata, 1987

Story collections 
 Heresā, 1959
 Sāhitya Chāsa, 1959
 Bidushaka, 1963
 Mangalabāria Sāhitya Sansada, 1963
 Hasakurā, 1972
 Bruhat Bhānda, 1977
 Amruta Behiā, 1977
 Vote, 1980
 Gamāt, 1982
 Nidābehel, 1982
 Sāhitya Beushana, 1983
 Nabajiā, 1983
 Thatalibāj, 1983
 Sāhitya Bachābachi, 1983
 Maskarā, 1984
 Tāhuliā 1985
 Tāpuriā, 1986
 Muchukundiā, 1990
 Khilikhiliā, 1993
 Odishāra Spin Bowler, 1994

Poetry 
 Nilathā Kabi, 1955

Play 
 Kalikati Chenka, 1984

Children's Literature 
 Ajagabi Sikāra
 Nālura Chandra Yātra, 1991

Translations 
 Ādarsha Hindu Hotel, 1977 - By Bibhutibhushana Chattopādyāya
 Bhāratara Shrestha Hāsyagalpa, 1980 - By Mujtabā Hossein

Other 
 Famālochanā, 1987
 Faturānandanka Dusprāpya Rachanā, 1999

References 

1915 births
1995 deaths
Writers from Odisha
Odia-language writers
Indian satirists
Indian male writers
Indian humorists